Neoglyphidodon polyacanthus is a species of damselfish of the family Pomacentridae. It is native to the western Pacific Ocean. This species of fish is found in the aquarium trade.

Distribution and habitat
This species of fish is found in reefs in the western Pacific Ocean. Adults are found outside of lagoons while juvenile could be found in them. They are found in areas of the western Pacific Ocean from the southern Great Barrier Reef in Australia and New Caledonia. In Lord Howe Island, they are found everywhere.

Description
The juvenile and adults of this species have different coloration. In adults, they have a grayish black coloration. Juveniles are yellow with blue lines extending from the eye to their eyespot. They lose their coloration as they mature.

In the aquarium
This species of damselfish is found in the aquarium trade. In the aquarium, people feed them flake food, frozen food, and live food.

References

polycanthus
Fish described in 1889